Charles Eric Whitely (12 January 1904 – 12 September 1953) was an Australian rules footballer who played with  and  in the Victorian Football League (VFL).

Early life
The son of William Albert James Whitely (1873–1943) and Elizabeth Mary Whitely, nee Babbington (1873–1953), Charles Eric Whitely was born at Albury on 12 January 1904.

Football
Whitely was a lightly-built wingman and half-forward who had a neat left foot stab-pass.

He commenced his football career with the Hume Weir club in the Ovens & Murray Football League where he played from 1922 to 1924.

In 1925 Whitely joined Richmond, making his solitary appearance in the senior team in their loss to Carlton.

He transferred to Hawthorn for the 1926 VFL season and scored a goal on debut against St Kilda but also fractured a rib and never again played a VFL match. 

Whitely later transferred to Prahran and then Brunswick in the Victorian Football Association.

Later life
In 1926 Charles Whitely married Thelma Sedgman and they lived in Melbourne with Whitely working as a mechanic until they moved to the Yarra Junction area in the early 1950s. 

Charles Eric Whitely died in September 1953 and was cremated at Fawkner Memorial Park.

Notes

External links 

1904 births
1953 deaths
Richmond Football Club players
Hawthorn Football Club players
Prahran Football Club players
Brunswick Football Club players
Australian rules footballers from Albury